WDAQ (98.3 FM), "98Q") is a Hot AC radio station licensed to Danbury, Connecticut, and serving part of Western Connecticut and Putnam County, New York.  The station is owned by The Berkshire Broadcasting Corporation, along with sister stations WLAD 800 AM and WAXB 850 AM.  The radio studios and offices are on Mill Plain Road in Danbury.

WDAQ has an Effective Radiated Power (ERP) of 1,300 watts.   The transmitter is on Brushy Hill Road in Danbury.  It broadcasts using HD Radio technology.  WDAQ has four digital subchannels, three of them feeding FM translators with formats including alternative rock (103.7), country music (107.3) and classic hits (94.5).

History

Rural Network
In 1953, the station first signed on as WLAD-FM.  Then, as now, it was owned by Berkshire Broadcasting with studios at the time located at 307 Main Street.  WLAD-FM was one of the first Class A FM stations in the United States, designed to have only a regional signal.  It was also the first FM station to sign on in the Danbury area, four years prior to the start of 95.1 WINE-FM (now WRKI).

Originally, WLAD-FM was part of the Rural Radio Network as one of two Connecticut affiliates of the New York-based chain.  Several years later, WLAD-FM evolved into an extension of its then daytime-only sister station, WLAD 800 AM.  When the AM facility had to go off the air at sunset, WLAD-FM continued its programming into the evening.

Beautiful Music
In the mid-1960s, the Federal Communications Commission began encouraging AM-FM combos to end full time simulcasting.  WLAD-FM upgraded to an FM stereo signal and flipped to a beautiful music format, which was automated in 1975.  WLAD-FM played quarter hour sweeps of mostly instrumental cover versions of popular songs as well as Broadway and Hollywood show tunes.

In 1979, the call sign was changed to WDAQ, to create a separate identity from WLAD.  WDAQ was competing with 99.9 WEZN from Bridgeport, Connecticut, and 100.7 WHUD from Peekskill, New York, for Greater Danbury's easy listening audience.

Adult Contemporary
By the early 1980s, the audience for the easy listening format was aging, while most advertisers seek youthful and middle aged consumers.  WDAQ added more soft vocals and reduced the instrumentals to appeal to a more youthful audience.  By the mid-eighties, WDAQ completed the shift to soft adult contemporary, rebranded as "Lite 98."

By the late 1980s, WDAQ faced a more crowded market of adult contemporary signals.  WEBE 107.9 FM in Westport, Connecticut adopted the AC format in 1984 and then WEZN contemporized its easy listening format in 1987.  Seeing an opportunity between teen formatted WKCI-FM, mainstream AC WEBE and soft AC WEZN, WDAQ was reborn as Hot AC 98Q in September, 1989. The station's initial music mix relied heavily on 1970s titles that had not been played on the radio for several years. Within a year, WDAQ shot to #1 beating co-owned full-service 800 WLAD and crosstown rocker 95.1 WRKI.

During its more than 30 years as "98Q," the station has finished first in virtually every Danbury Arbitron/Nielsen ratings survey. The station continues its hyper-focus on Greater Danbury as opposed to the more regional approaches of the other FM stations in the area.

HD Radio
On August 7, 2015, WDAQ upgraded to HD Radio, and launched a new Alternative station on 103.7 MHz, fed by its HD2 subchannel, as "103.7 Danbury's New Rock Alternative", which launched on the 10th at Noon after stunting with loops of songs that changed each hour, with songs like "Rapper's Delight" by The Sugarhill Gang and "Drunk on a Plane" by Dierks Bentley. The first song on 103.7 was "Renegades" by X Ambassadors.

In July 2016, Berkshire launched a new country music station on 107.3 MHz, fed by its HD3 subchannel, as "107.3 The Bull".

On December 17, 2020, "94.5 The Hawk" was moved from WAXB to WDAQ-HD4, and continued to simulcast on 94.5 W233CF. It changed its format to classic hits on March 21, 2022 while keeping The Hawk branding.

Translators

References

External links

DAQ
Danbury, Connecticut
Mass media in Fairfield County, Connecticut
Hot adult contemporary radio stations in the United States
Radio stations established in 1953
1953 establishments in Connecticut